Chronic functional abdominal pain (CFAP) or functional abdominal pain syndrome (FAPS) is the ongoing presence of abdominal pain for which there is no known medical explanation, and has the potential to interfere with all aspects of daily functioning. It is quite similar to, but less common than, irritable bowel syndrome (IBS), and many of the same treatments for IBS can also be of benefit to those with CFAP. The fundamental difference between IBS and CFAP is that in CFAP, unlike in IBS, there is no change in bowel habits such as constipation or diarrhea. Bowel dysfunction is a necessary diagnostic criterion of IBS.

CFAP is characterized by chronic pain, with no physical explanation or findings (no structural, infectious, or mechanical causes can be found), although the pain may originate in the viscera, fascial layers, muscles, or peripheral nerves. It is theorized that CFAP is a disorder of the nervous system where normal nociceptive nerve impulses are amplified "like a stereo system turned up too loud" resulting in pain. This visceral hypersensitivity may be a stand-alone cause of CFAP, or CFAP may result from the same type of brain-gut nervous system disorder that underlies IBS. As with IBS, low doses of antidepressants have been found useful in controlling the pain of CFAP.

References

Further reading
 

Digestive diseases
Chronic pain syndromes